Abigail Magistrati (born 29 December 2003) is an Argentine artistic gymnast.  She represented Argentina at the 2020 Summer Olympics after Martina Dominici, the original qualifier, tested positive for a banned substance.

Early life
Magistrati was born in La Plata in 2003 and began gymnastics when she was three years old.

Gymnastics career

Junior

2017
Magistrati competed at her debut Argentinian National Championships in 2017, placing 11th in the junior division.  She was next selected to represent Argentina at the Junior South American Championships where she helped Argentina finish second behind Brazil.  Individually she placed fourth in the all-around, on vault, and floor exercise.  She ended the year competing at the South American Youth Games where she helped Argentina win the team competition.  Individually she placed fifth in the all-around and fourth on vault but won gold on the uneven bars.

2018 
Magistrati started the season competing at the Pacific Rim Championships.  Although Argentina could not win medals as they are not part of the Pacific Rim alliance, they did record the third-highest team score, and Magistrati recorded the fifth-highest all-around score.  At the Junior Pan American Championships Magistrati helped Argentina finish third as a team; Magistrati finished ninth in the all-around.  Additionally, she finished fourth on balance beam and seventh on uneven bars.  Magistrati next competed at the Argentinian Club Championships, where she placed second in the all-around and helped her club place first.  In October Magistrati competed at the Junior South American Championships where she helped Argentina finish second as a team and individually she placed seventh in the all-around.  She won gold on vault and silver on uneven bars during the finals.  Magistrati ended the season competing at the Argentinian national championships where she placed third in the all-around.  She won gold on vault and silver on uneven bars.

Senior

2019 
Magistrati turned senior in 2019.  She made her debut at the Club Championships, placing first in the all-around.  She made her senior international debut at the South American Championships, where she placed first in the all-around and helped Argentina win the team title.  She won silver on balance beam during the event finals and placed seventh on floor exercise.  She next competed at the Pan American Games where she helped Argentina place fourth.  Individually she placed eighth on uneven bars and floor exercise.  At the Argentinian national championships she placed third in the all-around and first on floor exercise.  Magistrati was selected to represent Argentina at the World Championships in Stuttgart, Germany.  During qualifications, she finished 36th in the all-around and did not qualify for the final.  Also, because teammate Martina Dominici finished ahead of her, Magistrati did not qualify an individual berth to the 2020 Summer Olympics due to the one-per-country limit.

2021
Magistrati returned to competition at the 2021 Pan American Championships, where she helped Argentina place third, and individually she placed 10th in the all-around.  She placed eighth on balance beam and fourth on floor exercise; however, teammate Martina Dominici tested positive for a banned substance, and her scores were removed, resulting in Magistrati winning the bronze on floor exercise.  Also, Dominici received a one-month ban from competition resulting in her withdrawal from the 2020 Olympic Games.  As a result, Magistrati, who originally didn't qualify due to the 1-per-country rule, was awarded the Olympic berth.

Competitive history

References

External links
 
 
 
 

2003 births
21st-century Argentine women
Argentine female artistic gymnasts
Competitors at the 2019 Pan American Games
Competitors at the 2022 South American Games
Gymnasts at the 2019 Pan American Games
Gymnasts at the 2020 Summer Olympics
Living people
Olympic gymnasts of Argentina
Pan American Games competitors for Argentina
South American Games medalists in gymnastics
South American Games silver medalists for Argentina
Sportspeople from La Plata